Miguel Odalis Báez Camino (born 29 September 1983), known as Odalis Báez, is a Dominican footballer who plays for Liga Dominicana de Fútbol club Atlético Pantoja and the Dominican Republic national team.

External links

1983 births
Living people
People from La Romana, Dominican Republic
Dominican Republic footballers
Association football goalkeepers
Kristiansund BK players
America Football Club (RJ) players
Antigua Barracuda F.C. players
Atlético Pantoja players
Liga Dominicana de Fútbol players
Dominican Republic international footballers
Dominican Republic expatriate footballers
Dominican Republic expatriate sportspeople in Uruguay
Expatriate footballers in Uruguay